This is a list of chapters within the various Pokémon manga.

Pokémon: The Electric Tale of Pikachu!

Pokémon Adventures

Pokémon Réburst

Magical Pokémon Journey

Pocket Monsters Zensho
A shōnen Pokémon manga directly based on the Pokémon games. It was released in 1998. It follows the plot of Pokémon Red and Blue Versions closer than any other Pokémon manga.

Many details not included in other manga or anime, such as the hunt for Warden Slowpoke's dentures, are covered. 
It was released in a single volume containing 10 chapters. It ends with the defeat of the Elite Four.

Ash & Pikachu
Ash & Pikachu (Satoshi to Pikachu in Japan) is a 6 volume manga series made by Takashi Teshirogi. The series follows the plot and characters from the anime. It is published in English in Singapore by Chuang Yi.

Pokémon Gold & Silver: The Golden Boys 
Pokémon Gold & Silver: The Golden Boys (Japanese title: Pocket Monster Gōrudo Shirubā Golden Boys) is a manga series based on the Pokémon games called Pokémon Gold and Silver.

The series is made by Muneo Saito. All three volumes of Pokémon Gold & Silver are published in English in Singapore by Chuang Yi.

Pokémon Ruby-Sapphire

Pokémon Ruby-Sapphire is a continuation of the Pokémon Pocket Monsters manga series which is based on the video games Pokémon Ruby and Sapphire. It was created by Kosaku Anakubo and published by Chuang Yi in English.

Pokémon Jirachi Wish Maker

Pokémon Destiny Deoxys

Pokémon Lucario and the Mystery of Mew

Pokémon Ranger and the Temple of the Sea

Pokémon: The Rise of Darkrai

Pokémon: Giratina and the Sky Warrior

Pokémon: Arceus and the Jewel of Life

Pokémon: Zoroark: Master of Illusions

Pokémon The Movie: Black: Victini and Reshiram and White: Victini and Zekrom

Pokémon Black and White

References